Emerson Christian Hancock (born May 31, 1999) is an American professional baseball pitcher in the Seattle Mariners organization. He was selected sixth overall by the Mariners in the 2020 Major League Baseball draft.

Amateur career
Hancock attended Cairo High School in Cairo, Georgia. As a senior, he went 11–1 with 0.75 earned run average (ERA) and 125 strikeouts over 65 innings. He was drafted by the Arizona Diamondbacks in the 38th round of the 2017 Major League Baseball draft. He did not sign with the Diamondbacks and honored his commitment to play college baseball at the University of Georgia.

As a freshman at Georgia in 2018, Hancock started 15 games, going 6–4 with a 5.10 ERA and 75 strikeouts in 77  innings. As a sophomore in 2019, he went 8–3 in 14 starts with a 1.99 ERA and 97 strikeouts in  innings. After the season, he was invited to play for the USA Baseball Collegiate National Team. He made four starts in 2020 before the season was cancelled due to the COVID-19 pandemic.

Professional career
Hancock was selected sixth overall by the Seattle Mariners in the 2020 Major League Baseball draft. Hancock signed with the Mariners for a bonus of $5.7 million.

Hancock made his professional debut in 2021 with the Everett AquaSox of the High-A West. In June 2021, Hancock was selected to play in the All-Star Futures Game. He was promoted to the Arkansas Travelers of the Double-A Central in August. Over 12 starts between the two teams, he went 3-1 with a 2.62 ERA and 43 strikeouts over  innings. He missed time during the season due to a shoulder injury.

References

External links

Georgia Bulldogs bio

1999 births
Living people
People from Cairo, Georgia
Baseball players from Georgia (U.S. state)
Baseball pitchers
Georgia Bulldogs baseball players
Everett AquaSox players
Arkansas Travelers players
United States national baseball team players